Hiroyuki Takagi (高木 浩之, born October 14, 1972) is a former Nippon Professional Baseball infielder.

External links

1972 births
Living people
Baseball people from Aichi Prefecture
People from Inazawa
Komazawa University alumni
Japanese baseball players
Nippon Professional Baseball infielders
Seibu Lions players
Saitama Seibu Lions players
Japanese baseball coaches
Nippon Professional Baseball coaches